Quinta do Lago is a golf resort in Almancil, in the Algarve region of southern Portugal. Quinta do Lago comprises one of the three corners of the Golden Triangle of the Algarve's most affluent communities.

The community hosted the Portuguese Open, part of the PGA European Tour, in 1976, 1984–1986, 1988, 1989, 1990, and most recently in 2001.

History

Quinta do Lago was founded in 1971 by Polish-Brazilian property developer André Jordan, three years after the end of the Salazar's rule.

The original 550 hectare site, "Quinta dos Ramalhos" (Ramalhos Estate) contained the ruins of an old farmhouse (today "Casa Velha", having been rebuilt as a restaurant in 1972) and a stone pine forest adjacent to both the Ria Formosa and the growing resort of Vale do Lobo which had been founded eight years earlier. Jordan's company, Planal, acquired the property on 20 December 1971. The large beach-lined estate had been previously owned by the Pinto de Magalhães family for more than 300 years. Within three years, a bridge to the beach had been built to the beach, the lake was created over the salty sands, and 27 holes of golf designed by architect William F. Mitchell had been completed.

Following the 1974 Carnation revolution, Andre Jordan returned to Brazil, leaving the Portuguese state to manage. The inauguration of the golf courses in 1974 was presided over by revolutionary leader Otelo Saraiva de Carvalho, and in 1976 the Portuguese Open was held in Quinta do Lago for the first time.

In 1981 Portuguese politics stabilized and Quinta do Lago management was returned to Planal, and Jordan returned to Portugal. The Portuguese Open was again held in Quinta do Lago in 1984–86. In 1986 the Four Seasons Country Club opened in the heart of Quinta, followed by the Four Seasons Fairways; neither resort is related to the Canadian Four Seasons Hotels and Resorts group.

In 1987 Jordan sold the resort (i.e. Planal, the holding company) to a consortium of British shareholders headed by Roger Abraham, a former banker at Chase Manhattan Bank, and food entrepreneur David Thompson. By 1989 Abraham had withdrawn and Thompson headed the resort alone. The Portuguese Open was held in the resort again in 1988-90 and in 2001.

In 1998 Planal was acquired by Irish billionaire Denis O'Brien.

Golf

Scorecards for the North, South, and Laranjal Courses:

North Course

South Course

Laranjal Course

Gallery

See also
 List of golf courses in Portugal

References

External links

Quinta do Lago – official site
Photos of Quinta do Lago
Quinta do Lago Hotel
 Faro Airport Transfers to Quinta do Lago

Resorts in Portugal
Golf clubs and courses in Portugal
Buildings and structures in the Algarve